Ralph Stawell, 1st Baron Stawell (c.1641 – 1689) was an English landowner, soldier, Member of Parliament and peer.

He was born c.1641, the fifth son (third surviving) of John Stawell (1600–1662), who was MP for Somerset and one of the leading Royalists in the West Country during the First Civil War. He succeeded an elder brother in 1669.

Stawell married firstly (around 1667) Ann, a daughter of John Ryves, Esquire, and by her had one son, John. Ann died in 1670 and in 1672 he married secondly Abigail, daughter and heiress of William Pitt, Esq., and with her had two sons and four daughters.

In 1679, standing in the Tory or "court" interest, Colonel Ralph Stawell was returned as one of the two members of parliament for Bridgwater in Somerset. A Roman Catholic, on 15 January 1683/84 Stawell was created Baron Stawell, of Somerton in the County of Somerset. In 1688, the year of the Glorious Revolution, he was briefly Lord Lieutenant of Somerset. In a commission dated from London on 6 November 1688, the day after the landing in England of William, Prince of Orange, King James II appointed Stawell as his Lord Lieutenant in Somerset in place of Lord Waldegrave, who was the husband of the king's illegitimate daughter Henrietta FitzJames.

Some sources have claimed that with the success of the Revolution against James, Stawell was committed to the Tower of London, where he died in 1689.  His parliamentary biography says that despite his appointment as Lord Lieutenant of Somerset by James II, Stawell at once rallied to William of Orange and makes no suggestion that he was imprisoned.

Ralph's widow Lady Abigail Pitt died in 1692, and is buried in St Mary's church, Hartley Wespall, Hampshire. On the north wall near the door of St. Mary's church, Hartley Wespall, can be found the memorial of Abigail, Lady Dowager of Ralph Lord Stawell, died 27 September 1692, daughter and heir of William Pitt of Hartley Wespall. Above are the arms of Pitt on a lozenge, while on consoles beneath are the arms of Stawell: Gules a cross lozengy argent, and the same impaling Pitt.

Notes

1689 deaths
Barons in the Peerage of England
Lord-Lieutenants of Somerset
Year of birth unknown
Year of birth uncertain